William Lower may refer to:
 Sir William Lower (astronomer), English astronomer and MP
 Sir William Lower (dramatist), English dramatist and translator
 William Lower (cyclist), British cyclist